Serangoon Bus Interchange is a bus interchange serving Serangoon New Town in Singapore, and is within walking distance from Serangoon MRT station. Opened on 3 September 2011, it is air-conditioned and has 9 services and 17 bus bays.

History
The original bus interchange was opened on 13 March 1988 along Serangoon Central. This interchange took over the overcrowded Serangoon Gardens Bus Interchange and a temporary bus terminal along Serangoon Avenue 3. The compound was located under a multi-storey carpark (Block 264), with end-on berths on the eastern side and sawtooth berths (with a bus park) on the western side. Access to the interchange was located along Serangoon Central.

When the shopping mall nex opened on 25 November 2010, the old bus interchange continued to operate due to congestion at Serangoon Avenue 2, carpark problems and large crowds in the shopping mall.

Relocation
On 3 September 2011, the interchange was relocated to a new air-conditioned facility along Serangoon Avenue 2 integrated with the shopping mall, nex, and the Serangoon MRT station, making it the fifth bus interchange to be air conditioned. The new facility was the first to have glass walls instead of cement walls facing the bus bays, allowing commuters to be aware of the departure of buses, which was not present in the earlier air conditioned bus interchanges. Due to space constraints, Bus Services 81 and 82 no longer terminated at the interchange and were amended to loop at Serangoon Central instead.

Bus Contracting Model

Under the new bus contracting model, with the exception of Bus Service 100 is under Clementi Bus Package, the rest of the bus services are under Serangoon-Eunos Bus Package.

Currently, all bus services at the interchange are operated by the anchor operator, SBS Transit.

List of routes

References

External links
 Interchanges and Terminals (SBS Transit)

2011 establishments in Singapore
Bus stations in Singapore
Buildings and structures in Serangoon
Transport in North-East Region, Singapore